Ondrejovce is a village and municipality in the Levice District in the Nitra Region of Slovakia.

History
In historical records the village was first mentioned in 1260.

Geography
The village lies at an altitude of 163 metres and covers an area of 19.611 km². It has a population of about 470 people.

Ethnicity
The village is approximately 62% Slovak and 37% Magyar and 1% Gypsy.

Facilities
The village has a public library and football pitch.

References

External links
http://www.obecondrejovce.sk

Villages and municipalities in Levice District